John Philip Sousa was an American composer and conductor of the late Romantic era. Although primarily known for American military marches, he also wrote operettas, which are relatively lesser-known and less performed. They show influences from Gilbert and Sullivan, including short recitatives and chorus finales. According to author Paul E. Bierley, Sousa's operettas displayed a "high standard of morality". Libretti for most of the operettas were written by various prominent as well as less experienced librettists, except for The Wolf and The Bride Elect, which were written by Sousa himself. Several famous stage personalities, including DeWolf Hopper, starred in the operettas.

Sousa composed Katherine, his first operetta, in 1879, and copyrighted but never published it. His next operetta, produced after becoming the leader of the United States Marine Band, was The Smugglers, which premiered in 1882. After some financial setbacks, in the mid-1890s, he reached the epitome of his career. His operetta El Capitan was later described by author Gerald Bordman as "boding well to be the most enduring American comic opera of the nineteenth century". El Capitan portrayed the Spanish administration in Peru and became hugely popular during the Spanish–American War. His other major operettas included The Charlatan, Chris and the Wonderful Lamp, The Free Lance, and The American Maid. Bierley later speculated that, had Sousa not been the leader of the United States Marine Band, "he probably would have chosen a career in theater music".

List of operettas

See also 
 List of marches by John Philip Sousa

Notes

References

Works cited 

 
 
 
 
 
 
 

John Philip Sousa
Compositions by John Philip Sousa
Lists of operas by composer